St Michael's Gaelic Football Club is a Gaelic football club in Cork City, Ireland. The club was formed in 1951 after a discussion in The Leaping Salmon Public House in Blackrock near Cork. At that time some of the Blackrock hurlers played football with different city teams and it was decided to enter a football team from Blackrock, thus keeping the players together. A formal meeting was held and St Michael's Gaelic Football Club was established.

Current Championship grades

History
St Michael's first match was against Crosshaven, with Jimmy Furlong as captain. The club's first success was in 1956 when St Michael's took their first Cork Junior Football Championship title, and as there was no Intermediate Championship or League the club took the decision to go Senior in 1957. The club failed to win a Senior County Title in 1976, 1977, and 1978, but competed in finals during these years against St Finbarr's and Nemo Rangers, and won two Kelleher Shield Titles. Eventually the decision was made to drop down to Intermediate level.

1964 and 1965 saw the first honours to the younger members of the club with Minor titles in the county championships, and the best result at this level was in 1974 when the club won city and county league and championships.

In 1998, the club won the Cork Intermediate Football Championship, beating St Finbarr's in the final for their second Intermediate title (after their first in 1969), returning the club to the Senior ranks.

St Michael's underage section began in the 1960s, led by Eamonn O'Donoghue with assistance from the chair of this age group, Bernard Hurley.

Achievements
 Cork Senior Football Championship Runners-Up 1976, 1977, 1978
 Cork Senior A Football Championship Winners 2022 | Runner-Up 2021
 Kelleher Shield (Senior Football League Champions 1976, 1978
 Kelleher Shield Div 3 Champions	2009
 Cork Premier Intermediate Football Championship] Runners-Up 2012, 2015, 2017, 2018, 2019
 Cork Intermediate Football Championship Winners (2) 1969, 1998   
 Cork Junior Football Championship Winners (1) 1956
 Cork Minor Football Championship Winners (7) 1938 (as Blackrock), 1964, 1965, 1974, 2006, 2008 & 2018
 Cork Junior B Inter-Divisional Football Championship Winners (1) 2019
 Cork City Junior Football Championship Winners (4) 1952, 1953, 1956, 1987  Runners-Up 1954, 1955, 1983
 Munster Club Division 2 Championship	Winners (1) 2005
 Cork City Under-21 Football Championship Winners (2)	1976, 2006
 Cork Under-21 Football Championship Winners (2) 1976, 2019
 City Minor Premier Football Championship Winners 	1974
 City Minor A City Football Championship	Winners (3)	1999, 2002, 2009    
 Minor A Football League Winners (1)		1999

Famous players
 Ray Cummins
 Billy Field

References

External links
Official St Michael's Gaelic Football Club website

Football
Gaelic games clubs in County Cork
Gaelic football clubs in County Cork